Erastroides is a genus of moths of the family Noctuidae. The genus was erected by George Hampson in 1893.

Description
It is similar to Erastria, but differs in the stalked veins 7, 8, 9, and 10, and absence of areole.

Species
Erastroides albiguttata Druce, 1909
Erastroides curvifascia Hampson, 1891
Erastroides emarginata Hampson, 1910
Erastroides endomela Hampson, 1910
Erastroides fausta Swinhoe, 1903
Erastroides flavibasalis Hampson, 1897
Erastroides hermosilla Schaus, 1904
Erastroides javensis Warren, 1913
Erastroides mesomela Hampson, 1910
Erastroides molybdopasta Turner, 1908
Erastroides oletta Schaus, 1904
Erastroides oliviaria Hampson, 1893
Erastroides propera Grote, 1882

References

Acontiinae